Guzzo is an Italian surname. Notable people with the surname include:

Alberto Breccia Guzzo (1946–2014), Uruguayan politician and lawyer
Garry Guzzo (born 1941), Canadian politician
Giovanni Guzzo (born 1986), Venezuelan violinist
Lou Guzzo (1919–2013), American journalist, author and television commentator
Marco Guzzo (born 1994), Italian footballer
Patsy Guzzo (1914–1993), Canadian ice hockey player, Olympic gold medalist
Raphael Guzzo (born 1995), Portuguese footballer
Vincenzo Guzzo (born 1969), Canadian entrepreneur

Italian-language surnames